John Dixon Mowat  was Dean of Brechin from 1947 until 1953.

He was educated at Durham University and ordained in 1908. He was Rector of St Salvador Dundee from 1918 to 1929; and St Mary Arbroath from 1929.

Notes

Scottish Episcopalian clergy
Deans of Brechin
Year of birth missing
Year of death missing
People associated with Dundee
Alumni of the College of the Venerable Bede, Durham